Sognando la California is a 1992 Italian comedy film directed by Carlo Vanzina.

Cast
Massimo Boldi as Lorenzo Colombo
Nino Frassica as Antonio Castagna
Antonello Fassari as Giovanni Sbariggia
Maurizio Ferrini as Silvio Morandi
Bo Derek as herself
Francesca Reggiani as Cinzia Morechini 
Renato Pareti as Bepi
Irene Lovborg as the girl at the airport
Scott Bray as an Italian tourist

References

External links

1992 films
Films directed by Carlo Vanzina
1990s Italian-language films
1992 comedy films
Italian comedy films
1990s Italian films